Ernest Gondzik (25 February 1931 – 13 August 2021) was a Polish wrestler. He competed at the 1952 Summer Olympics and the 1960 Summer Olympics.

References

External links
 

1931 births
2021 deaths
Polish male sport wrestlers
Olympic wrestlers of Poland
Wrestlers at the 1952 Summer Olympics
Wrestlers at the 1960 Summer Olympics
People from Mysłowice
Sportspeople from Silesian Voivodeship
People from Silesian Voivodeship (1920–1939)
20th-century Polish people
21st-century Polish people